Cynthia A. Brewer is an American professor of geography at the Pennsylvania State University, Pennsylvania, and author. She has worked as a map and atlas design consultant for the U.S. Census Bureau, National Cancer Institute, National Center for Health Statistics, and National Park Service. She teaches courses in introductory cartography and map design. Her specialism relates to visibility and color theory in cartography. She also works on topographic map design, multi-scale mapping, generalization, and atlas mapping. She has been influential as a theorist for map representations and GIS professionals.

Her web, print, and colorblind-friendly set of colors known as ColorBrewer colors have been used by numerous projects. She is the creator for the Apache 2.0 licensed web application ColorBrewer.

Education
She graduated from McMaster University (Ontario, Canada) in 1979 and University of Guelph (Ontario, Canada) in 1983. She did her master's degree in geography with emphasis in cartography at Michigan State University, 1983 to 1986, presenting a thesis titled The Development of Process-Printed Munsell Charts for Selecting Map Colors. After a year at University of California at Santa Barbara, she obtained her doctorate from Michigan State University in 1991. Her dissertation was Prediction of Surround-Induced Changes in Map Color Appearance.

Academic career
She was visiting lecturer at the University of California at Santa Barbara, Department of Geography during the year 1986/87.
On completing her doctorate she was assistant professor, for three years (1991 to 1994) at San Diego State University. She joined the Pennsylvania State University, Department of Geography in 1994 and has been professor since 2007 and head of department since 2014.

She has been a faculty member of the Center of Excellence for Geospatial Information Science (CEGIS), U.S. Geological Survey, Department of Interior, since 2008.

ColorBrewer

Choosing effective colour schemes for thematic maps, (or Choropleths) is unexpectedly complex. A sequence of colors has to be selected to represent the data. For deciles, ten related colors must be selected. These colors can be chosen according to schemes such as sequential, diverging and qualitative (categorical). The results must consider the end-use environment for the map (e.g., CRT, LCD, printed, projected, photocopied). There are five colour specification systems with numbers commonly written in hexadecimal and decimal.

ColorBrewer is an online tool designed to take some of the guesswork out of this process by helping users select appropriate colour schemes for their specific mapping needs. It was launched in 2002. It is licensed using Apache 2.0 software license, which is similar to CC-BY-SA 3.0.

In 2018, climate scientist Ed Hawkins chose the eight most saturated blues and reds from the ColorBrewer 9-class single-hue palettes in his design of warming stripes graphics, which visually summarize global warming as a sequence of stripes.

Brewer palettes
Valid names and a full color representation for each palette are shown below. If this is viewed in a compliant browser, moving the mouse cursor over each box will pop up the corresponding color number as a tooltip. 

YlGn
YlGnBu
GnBu
BuGn
PuBuGn
PuBu
BuPu
RdPu
PuRd
OrRd
YlOrRd
YlOrBr
Purples
Blues
Greens
Oranges
Reds
Greys

PuOr
BrBG
PRGn
PiYG
RdBu
RdGy
RdYlBu
Spectral
RdYlGn

Accent
Dark2
Paired
Pastel1
Pastel2
Set1
Set2
Set3

Further research
Most of this work is applicable to computer based GIS work.
Leading from the original work, investigations have been made into schemes for differing types of colorblindness.
Other cartographers in this field include Gretchen N Petersen and Cindy's mentor Judy M Olson,  Professor Emerita of Geography, Michigan State University.

See also 
 Cartography
 Edward Tufte
 Chartjunk
 Scientific visualization
 GIS

References

Publications

Books

Articles
 
 
 
 
 
 An Evaluation of Color Selections to Accommodate Map Users with Color-Vision Impairments

External links
 Personal website
 ColorBrewer2.org — tool for selecting color palettes

Year of birth missing (living people)
Living people
American geographers
Pennsylvania State University faculty
Color scientists
Geographic information scientists